Borough Green is situated in the borough of Tonbridge and Malling in Kent, England. The central area is situated on the A25 road between Maidstone and Sevenoaks, with the M26 motorway running through the centre dividing Wrotham and Borough Green. The word 'Borough' relates to the fact that Borough Green was a developed suburban area of Wrotham village and the division spread in the 1980s.

History
The name of the community describes what it originally was – a green to which the people of what was then the borough of Wrotham went for recreation and Wrotham remains a village. There is also a view that "borough", which predates any borough council in the area, relates to the word barrow, possibly referring to the Roman remains near the station site.

Its location at a crossroads with the old route from Gravesend to Hastings meant that inns were gradually opened. The Red Lion, founded in 1586, is now closed. The 1592 Black Bull became the Black Horse, then The Black Horse and Hooden, and recently The Black Horse again. The Bull of 1753 survives, but the Fox and Hounds (1837) and The Rock (1860) have turned into private housing. The 1878 Railway Hotel, later The Henry Simmonds, is now a Sainsbury's Local food store.

Great Comp, an early 17th-century house, is located in the parish of St Mary's Platt, one mile to the east of Borough Green. Its gardens, administered by a charitable trust, are open to the public.

The London, Chatham and Dover Railway opened a line to Maidstone on 1 June 1874, and a station named Wrotham and Borough Green was built. Later the names were reversed to Borough Green and Wrotham, in line with the position of the station within Borough Green, and the fact that Borough Green had outgrown Wrotham.

The River Bourne flows through the southern part of the parish. It once powered a paper mill at Basted.

Sports
Borough Green is home to the British Racing and Sports Car Club, one of the major organisers of motorsports events in the United Kingdom. The village's main football team is Potters Football Club of the Sevenoaks & District Premier Division, which fields one men's team. It has close ties with Borough Green Junior Football Club, which is also located in the village.

Churches
Several denominations have places of worship in Borough Green:
Anglican – Church of England: The Church of the Good Shepherd, Quarry Hill Road
Baptist – Association of Grace Baptist Churches (South East): Borough Green Baptist Church, High Street
Roman Catholic – St Joseph's, Western Road

Amenities
The village and nearby communities are served by Borough Green Primary School.

Borough Green had branches of two nationwide retail banks, both of which closed in 2017. Two supermarket chains remain, as do several independent retailers and teashops. There is a store with a post office counter in the High Street.

Notable people
Catherine Crowe (1803–1876), novelist and playwright, was born Catherine Ann Stevens in Borough Green.
Richard Dixon, a chemist who has done notable work on the thermal and optical properties of matter, was born in Borough Green on 25 December 1930.
Richard Hearne (1908–1979), actor, comedian and writer, most famous as Mr Pastry a comical children's character, lived at Platt's Farm, Long Mill Lane in nearby St Mary Platt from the 1940s.
Eva McLaren (1852–1921), suffragist and writer, died at Great Comp Cottage in Borough Green.
Denton Welch (1915-1948) author and artist

References

The Kent Village Book, Alan Bignell, published by Countryside Books in 1986
Borough Green Primary School website: [www.bgpschool.kent.sch.uk/ Retrieved 8 September 2018]
Borough Green Past and Present, published in 1994 and available in the Borough Green branch of Kent County Council Library

External links

Borough Green community website

Villages in Kent
Civil parishes in Kent
Tonbridge and Malling